The 2022–23 Baylor Bears men's basketball team represents Baylor University in the 2022–23 NCAA Division I men's basketball season, which is the Bears' 117th basketball season. The Bears, members of the Big 12 Conference, play their home games at the Ferrell Center in Waco, Texas. They are led by 20th-year head coach Scott Drew.

Previous season
The Bears finished the 2021–22 season 27–7, 14–4 in Big 12 play to finish a tie for the regular season championship. They lost in the quarterfinals of the Big 12 tournament to Oklahoma. They received an at-large bid to the NCAA tournament as the No. 1 seed in the East Region, where they defeated Norfolk State in the first round before getting upset in the second round by North Carolina.

Offseason

Departures

Incoming transfers

Recruiting classes

2022 recruiting class

2023 recruiting class

2024 recruiting class

Roster

Schedule and results

|-
!colspan=12 style=| Regular season

|-
!colspan=12 style=| Big 12 tournament

|-
!colspan=12 style=""| NCAA tournament

Source:

Rankings

*AP does not release post-NCAA Tournament rankings.

References

Baylor
Baylor Bears men's basketball seasons
Baylor
Baylor
Baylor